The St. Louis Steamers was the name of a professional indoor soccer team based in St. Louis, Missouri. It was the second team to use this name. The first played in the Major Indoor Soccer League from 1979–1988, while this version played in the World Indoor Soccer League from 2000 to 2001, then in the MISL from the 2003–04 season to the 2005–06 season.

The St. Louis Steamers were granted a World Indoor Soccer League expansion franchise in December 1998 but did not begin play until the 2000 season. In 2002, the team, along with fellow WISL teams Dallas Sidekicks and San Diego Sockers joined the Major Indoor Soccer League when the two leagues merged. However, the Steamers elected to take a year off to reorganize.

The team was purchased before the 2004–05 season by owners planning a reality television series about the team, which was called Red Card  and played on KPLR channel 11.  The team suspended operations after the 2005–2006 season.

Honors
Division titles
 2005–2006 MISL Regular Season

Year-by-year

Head coaches
 Daryl Doran 2000–2001 & 2003–2005
 Omid Namazi 2005–2006
 Joe Reiniger 2005–2006 (served as head coach during a Namazi suspension)

Notable players
 Joe Reiniger
 Randy Soderman
 Lindsay Kennedy

Owners
 Michael Hetelson, (CEO/Managing Partner) (2004-2006)
 Wally Smerconish (2004-2006)

Arenas
 Family Arena 2000–2001 & 2003–2004
 Scottrade Center 2004–2006

See also
 Soccer in St. Louis

References

 
Association football clubs established in 1998
Association football clubs disestablished in 2006
Sports in St. Charles, Missouri
Steamers 1998-2006
Soccer clubs in Missouri
World Indoor Soccer League teams
Major Indoor Soccer League (2001–2008) teams
Defunct indoor soccer clubs in the United States
1998 establishments in Missouri
2006 disestablishments in Missouri